2014 EC is a 10-meter sized, eccentric asteroid, classified as near-Earth object of the Apollo group that passed within  of Earth in early March 2014. This  was six times closer to the Earth than the Moon. It was first observed on 5 March 2014, by the Catalina Sky Survey at Mount Lemmon Observatory in Arizona, United States. As of 2017, it has not since been observed.

Description 

 has only been observed on two nights for a period of less than 48 hours, with a remaining orbital uncertainty of 4 and 6 respectively. It orbits the Sun at a distance of 0.7–2.2 AU once every 21 months (644 days). Its orbit has an eccentricity of 0.53 and an inclination of 1° with respect to the ecliptic.

Based on a generic magnitude-to diameter conversion,  measures 7 meters in diameter, for a measured absolute magnitude of 28.2 and an assumed albedo of 0.2, which is typical value for stony S-type asteroids. Other sources estimated the body to be approximately 10 meters or 30 feet across. It is too small for being a potentially hazardous asteroid, which require an absolute magnitude of 22.0 or less.

See also 
List of asteroid close approaches to Earth in 2014

References

External links 
 Small Asteroid Will Pass Earth Safely on Thursday (NASA)
 http://www.space.com/24968-small-asteroid-2014ec-earth-close-shave.html
 
 
 

Minor planet object articles (unnumbered)
20140308
20140301